Daniel W. Thatcher is an American politician and a Republican member of the Utah State Senate representing District 11 since 2023. Prior to redistricting he represented District 12.

Personal life, education, and career
Thatcher was born and raised in West Valley City. Thatcher's official biography describes him as self-educated. His profession is in electronics and low voltage wiring.

Political career

Senator Thatcher began his political pursuits when he co-founded the Salt Lake County Young Republicans. He was the chapter's first chair. He is also a co-founder of West Side Matters and has held various elected positions in the Salt Lake County Republican Party.
2010 To challenge incumbent Democratic Senator Brent H. Goodfellow, Thatcher was selected by the Republican convention from two candidates for the November 2, 2010 General election, which he won with 9,432 votes (53.25%) against Senator Goodfellow.

During the 2016 Session, Thatcher served on the following committees: 
Executive Offices and Criminal Justice Appropriations Subcommittee (Senate Chair)
Public Education Appropriations Subcommittee
Retirement and Independent Entities Appropriations Subcommittee
Senate Government Operations and Political Subdivisions Committee
Senate Health and Human Services Committee
Senate Judiciary, Law Enforcement, and Criminal Justice Committee
Senate Retirement and Independent Entities Committee

Elections

2014

Legislation

2016 sponsored bills

Notable legislation 
In 2015, the School Safety and Crisis Line legislation (SB 175), sponsored by Thatcher and Rep. Steve Eliason, passed the Utah State Legislature designating UNI (University Neuropsychiatric Institute, now Huntsman Mental Health Institute) as the crisis provider and an active commission, chaired out of the attorney general's office, for implementation. Thatcher chose to sponsor the legislation after recognizing the statewide epidemic that had personally impacted him numerous times throughout his life.

References

External links
Official page at the Utah State Legislature
Daniel W. Thatcher at Ballotpedia
Daniel W. Thatcher at OpenSecrets
Senator Daniel Thatcher at Thatcher for Senate 12

Place of birth missing (living people)
Year of birth missing (living people)
Living people
People from West Valley City, Utah
Republican Party Utah state senators
21st-century American politicians